In molecular biology, Yar (yellow-achaete intergenic RNA) is a long non-coding RNA found in Drosophila. It is located within a neuronal gene cluster between the yellow and achaete genes.  It is found in the cytoplasm of cells and is required for the regulation of sleep.

See also
 Long noncoding RNA

References

Non-coding RNA